Gubernatoriana is a genus of freshwater crabs, found among the Western Ghats in India.

Species 
Gubernatoriana basalticola 
Gubernatoriana gubernatoris 
Gubernatoriana longipes 
Gubernatoriana marleshwarensis 
Gubernatoriana pilosipes 
Gubernatoriana triangulus 
Gubernatoriana wallacei

References 

Gecarcinucidae
Decapod genera